The Tunisia women's national youth handball team(), nicknamed Les Aigles de Carthage (The Eagles of Carthage or The Carthage Eagles), represents Tunisia in the international handball competitions and it is controlled by the Tunisian Handball Federation

History

Youth Olympic Games 
 Champions   Runners up   Third place   Fourth place

Red border color indicates tournament was held on home soil.

World Championship

African Championship

See also
Tunisia women's national handball team
Tunisia women's national junior handball team
Tunisia men's national youth handball team

Other handball codes
Tunisia women's national beach handball team

References

External links
Tunisian Handball 
Tunisian Handball Info 
IHF profile

Women's national youth handball teams
Handball in Tunisia
H